is the name of two fictional characters in the Tekken fighting game series. The characters were inspired by the pro wrestler Satoru Sayama, as well as Mexican wrestler Fray Tormenta, a Catholic priest who became a masked wrestler in order to support an orphanage. The character of King has been in all the Tekken games to date, with King I being in Tekken and Tekken 2, and King II debuting in Tekken 3 and being in every subsequent game since. Reception of the character has been very positive since the beginning of the series, with King described as a "fan favorite" and considered one of the series' more iconic characters.

Character backstory

King I
The first King used to be a ruthless street brawling orphan with no care in the world except fighting. In one of his fights, King was grievously wounded and collapsed in front of a monastery. The Marquez priests saved him from death. After recovering, King realized the error of his ways and resolved to start a new life. He became a Catholic priest and renounced his old fighting ways. He then became a man with a mission; he dreamed of building an orphanage for street children, hoping to save them from becoming the kind of person he used to be. Eventually he was successful in building an orphanage, but funds were tight. To bring income to the orphanage, King fought in wrestling matches, donning his now iconic Jaguar mask to conceal his identity and acquiring the title "Beast Priest". It was at this time that King came to the attention of his future rival Armor King, one of a wrestling Tag Team who also wore Jaguar masks. Early in his career King accidentally crushed the eye of Armor King during a match. King has won many titles since, whilst the injury caused Armor King's career to plummet. King entered the first King of Iron Fist Tournament, in order to obtain them. He managed to defeat Armor King and get third place, winning enough prize money for the orphanage. After a child died in his care, King became depressed and, giving up his jaguar mask, returned to the street and became a raging alcoholic. He would have died had he not been convinced by his old friend and rival, Armor King, to again wear the jaguar mask and join the King of Iron Fist Tournament 2. King trained intensely and recovered from his alcoholism. He battled Armor King in a rematch at the tournament and was defeated. After the tournament, King participated in both pro-wrestling and martial arts tournaments to win money for his orphanage. He also taught his fighting skills to the children under his care as a means of self-defense. Sometime later on, Ogre, the God of Fighting, was awakened from an ancient ruin in Mexico by Heihachi Mishima's Tekken Force. Ogre attacked several martial artists around the world, including King, who was killed afterwards.

King II
The second King was a street urchin who was brought up in the first King's orphanage. Until the age of 24, this wrestler worked hard with King until one day, news broke of the first King's death at the hands of Ogre. Seeing that the orphanage would crumble into ruin (the money gained from King's wrestling matches was the only funding received), this man donned the mask of King and imitated his style. However, since his technique was learned just from watching King, not training with him, he lost every competition he entered. One day, however, another man with a mask visited the new King, introducing himself as an old friend. This man revealed himself to be Armor King, who was interested in finding out if the rumors of a new King were true. For four years, the two of them trained, and the new King learned quickly, maturing into a forceful wrestler with extreme power, known as King II. By this time, the now 28-year-old wrestler was a worthy heir to the throne, however, he longed to punish the one responsible for the original King's death. With rumors of the "God of Fighting" circulating, Armor King revealed to his student that the elusive entity was the one most likely responsible. Armor King watched as the new King, fueled with rage, set his sights on avenging his foster father's death and proving himself worthy of wearing the mask.

After the third King of Iron Fist Tournament, King (now 30) discovered that his master, Armor King, had been killed in a bar fight. The perpetrator, Craig Marduk, had been arrested in Arizona and was sent to prison. Upon Marduk's release (thanks to bribes paid by King himself), King sent a letter challenging Marduk to the tournament in Tekken 4. He defeated Marduk in the fourth King of Iron Fist Tournament, sending him to the hospital, where King followed him to deliver a deadly blow. However, he stopped after seeing a portrait of Marduk and his elderly parents. King let him live, realizing how foolish he had become. King was later enraged to find out that what appeared to be Marduk was defeating opponents in a black jaguar mask (identical to Armor King's), and that he had issued a televised challenge to King. Believing it to be truly Marduk disgracing his master, King entered the fifth King of Iron Fist Tournament to settle the score once and for all. King would meet Marduk in the King of Iron Fist Tournament 5 where he claimed to want to fight King fair and square (which confused King since what he heard and saw televised was foul play), and their subsequent battle resulted in another victory against Marduk and the start of their friendship and King's belief that it was not Marduk he saw televised. However, after the tournament, Marduk was brutally attacked, and he told King that the assailant was apparently the man he was convicted of killing, Armor King. Determined to learn the true identity of the man in Armor King's mask, King and Marduk entered the King of Iron Fist Tournament 6. While splitting up from Marduk, who went to Armor King's grave, King visited his late master's room, and found out from his old picture that other Armor King had a connection to him. By the time he arrived at the cemetery where Marduk and other Armor King are, King and Marduk found out that he is the vengeful younger brother of original Armor King himself. King returns as a playable character in Tekken 7, with an alternate costume based on New Japan Pro-Wrestling wrestler "Rainmaker" Kazuchika Okada being available for him in 2017. After Marduk and the younger Armor King ended up hospitalized themselves for ignoring King's peaceful treaties, King enters the tournament for not only their hospital bills and try to make amends with each other, but also the orphan he resided too. Once Marduk and Armor King II recovered, but realizing the peaceful amends might not go well if they keep fighting each other, King sets up the match between them, in order to avoid any sort of possible bloodshed, starting from suggesting Marduk to send a challenge letter titled retirement match once Armor King II fully recovered after Marduk does.

In video games

Gameplay
King is a character that has more of a defensive approach rather than a full blown offensive one, despite popular belief. King has to be played carefully since he has a limited range and is very unsafe. King relies on quick strikes, good movement, and a very good view on punishment. In game he is known for his speed and has an arsenal of over 200 moves in his command list. Being a professional wrestler with lucha libre influences, King has many powerful throws at his disposal, and has a lot of strong counterattacks. King is notable for his chain throws, which he's had since Tekken 2, when he was one of the very few characters to have them. He also utilizes duck throws, ground throws and air throws, uncommon for characters in the Tekken series.

As of Tekken 5, King seems to have drawn more wrestler-inspired moves into his repertoire, especially from superstars employed by the world-famous World Wrestling Entertainment (WWE). For example, he has a stunner used by Stone Cold Steve Austin and a version of The Rock's People's Elbow and Rock Bottom. Additionally, King has been able to perform the Sharpshooter innovated by Riki Choshu, later used by Bret Hart and the Tombstone Piledriver made famous by Dynamite Kid, later used by The Undertaker and Kane since Tekken 2. One of his victory poses has him side-stepping in a manner characteristic of the original Tiger Mask. King is also seen in the opening FMV of Tekken 5 performing a tiger feint after being thrown across the wrestling ring by Craig Marduk, in order to prevent a collision to the outside of the ring. The maneuver is currently a trademark move of Rey Mysterio, although the original Tiger Mask pioneered its use during matches with the Dynamite Kid in the early 1980s. Other moves he uses include the Frankensteiner and Steiner Screwdriver made famous by Scott Steiner and Kenta Kobashi's Burning Hammer. Finally, King's Muscle Buster pays homage to Suguru Kinniku's "Kinniku Buster", which is also a finishing move of wrestler Samoa Joe.

Spin-offs
King appears in the non-canon Tekken games Tekken Tag Tournament, Tekken Card Challenge, Tekken Advance, Tekken Resolute, Tekken Tag Tournament 2, Tekken 3D: Prime Edition and Tekken Arena and as a playable character in Street Fighter X Tekken, with his official tag partner, Marduk. King also made an appearance in the Namco crossover Namco × Capcom with Felicia from the Darkstalkers series as his fighting partner. King appears as a default playable character in the free-to-play game, Tekken Revolution. King appears as a Spirit in the Nintendo crossover video game Super Smash Bros. Ultimate. King appears as a playable character in Fist of the North Star Legends ReVIVE.

In other media and merchandise
King I makes a cameo appearance in Tekken: The Motion Picture as one of the tournament competitors. He has no spoken lines, and it is unknown how he progresses through the tournament. He is last seen being carried by Armor King I off the exploding Mishima resort. King II's dossier is briefly seen in the CGI film Tekken: Blood Vengeance when Anna Williams opens a file containing dossiers on various persons of interest.

King II makes an appearance in the anime adaptation Tekken: Bloodline. King II is a competitor in the third King of Iron Fist Tournament where, like in the games, he was originally an orphan under the original King before King I's death at the hands of Ogre. King II is regarded as rather intimidating by the other competitors due to his animalistic nature and continual silence. King II's noble nature is hinted at, however, when he discreetly visits Ling Xiaoyu in hospital after their match to make sure she is well; though the act is misinterpreted by Jin Kazama and her at the time. Rumors surrounding King II are only fully dispersed when Julia Chang reveals King II's good nature to Jin. Determined to continue his hero's legacy and save his orphanage, King II quickly becomes the tournament's dark horse, using his formidable skills to defeat Craig Marduk, Ling Xiaoyu, and even tournament favorite Paul Phoenix. Despite this, he is ultimately defeated by Jin in the tournament finals, who (having heard of his opponent's background) proceeds to gift the prize money to him; much to King's surprise.

Epoch Co. released a 1/10 scale King action figure, based on his appearance in Tekken 3. The action figure comes with a removable champion belt. Epoch Co. also released a 12-inch King action figured base on his Tekken 4 appearance.

Reception
Gaming Target placed King at #6 on their list of "Top 11 Tekken Fighters", complimenting his jaguar mask and noting that he's funny at times. King placed fifth in IGN's "Ten Best Fake Wrestlers In Videogame History", with the site citing the realism of his mask. IGN also states that "no one can deny the intimidation his animal head puts out". King was featured in the "Our 10 Favorite Video Game Character Rip-Offs" article by Complex, noting his similarities to the Japanese professional wrestler Satoru Sayama and commented "The thing that always creeped us out about King (both the original and the orphan who assumed his identity upon his death) is that his mask made it look like he had an actual jaguar head." Complex also compared King to El Fuerte from the Street Fighter series, predicting that he would win out of the two. Complex ranked King as "The 12th Most Dominant Fighting Game Character", commenting " Anybody who knew how to pull off King's chain grabs ran the Tekken arcade cabinet". Complex also ranked King as the 4th best Tekken character, commenting "A fierce competitor with flashy moves, King II is famous for his massive chain throws, which drain an opponent's entire life bar." GameDaily placed King at #4 on their list of "Top 25 Wrestling Characters of All Time" and comments "King knows how to kick butt in the Tekken series". 1UP.com named King as one of the characters they want to see in Street Fighter X Tekken, adding "The Figure 4 Leg Lock, Giant Swing, and the classic Rolling Death Cradle? Count me in." Now Gamer listed King and Hugo as one of the rivalries they want to see in Street Fighter X Tekken. In a GamesRadar article for Street Fighter X Tekken, they stated "a new wrestler (and former member of his (Armor King) orphanage) picked up the jaguar mask and trained to avenge him. Eventually King II became the equal of his inspiration as a fighter and performer." King was also ranked as the fifth best video game wrestler by GamesRadar, where they note "King is notable because he gives the developers an excuse to animate almost every single wrestling move known to man." Peter Austin from WhatCulture named King the "6th Greatest Tekken Character of All Time".

GameSpy called King's chain throws "ridiculously intricate". 1UP.com criticizes King's "Stagger Kicks" attack by calling it "lazy". However, before being confirmed for Street Fighter X Tekken, 1UP.com  listed King as one of the characters they wanted to see in the game. In the official poll by Namco, King is currently ranked as the 20th most requested Tekken character to be playable in Tekken X Street Fighter, at 6.47% of votes. King is also the most popular Tekken character in Japan.

References

Fictional alcohol abusers
Fictional characters without a name
Fictional luchadores
Fictional Mexican people in video games
Fictional priests and priestesses
Fictional professional wrestlers
Fictional mixed martial artists
Fictional murdered people
Fictional Brazilian jiu-jitsu practitioners
Fictional judoka
Fictional karateka
Fictional kendoka
Male characters in video games
Religious worker characters in video games
Orphan characters in video games
Tekken characters
Video game characters based on real people
Video game characters introduced in 1994
Video game characters introduced in 1997